Don Juan is an adaptation by the twentieth-century German dramatist Bertolt Brecht of the 17th century French play Dom Juan by Molière. It was the first performance of the Berliner Ensemble after its move to Theater am Schiffbauerdamm, in 1954.

References

Works cited
 Willett, John. 1959. The Theatre of Bertolt Brecht: A Study from Eight Aspects. London: Methuen. .

Plays by Bertolt Brecht
Compositions by Paul Dessau
Works based on the Don Juan legend